Indian-American filmmaker and actor M. Night Shyamalan began his career in 1992 with the student film Praying with Anger, which he wrote, directed, produced, and starred in. He then wrote the screenplays for the comedy movies Wide Awake (1998; also directed) and Stuart Little (1999). In 1999, he rose to prominence for writing and directing the supernatural movie The Sixth Sense, for which he received Academy Award nominations for Best Director and Best Original Screenplay. He then wrote, directed, and produced the superhero movie Unbreakable, the first entry in the Eastrail 177 Trilogy followed by Split in 2016 and Glass in 2019.

After Unbreakable, Shyamalan made Signs (2002) and The Village (2004), which increased his popularity with moviegoers and further established him as a filmmaker known for his original twist endings. The next decade, however, saw a series of critical misfires with Lady in the Water (2006), The Happening (2008), The Last Airbender (2010), and After Earth (2013). In 2015, he partnered with Universal Pictures for The Visit, a commercial success that made $98.5million on a $5million budget. Universal has since released his films Split, Glass, Old (2021), and Knock at the Cabin (2023). Shyamlan's next film, Trap, is set to be released by Warner Bros. Pictures in 2024.

Directing credits

Feature films

Television

Acting credits

Feature films

Television

Critical and public response
{| class="wikitable plainrowheaders"
|+ 
! scope="col" | Year
! scope="col" | Film
! scope="col" | Rotten Tomatoes
! scope="col" | Metacritic
! scope="col" | CinemaScore
|-
| 1992
! scope=row | Praying with Anger
| 
| 
| 
|-
| 1998
! scope=row | Wide Awake
| 45% (33 reviews)
| 
| 
|-
| 1999
! scope=row | 
| 86% (158 reviews)
| 64 (35 reviews)
| align="center" | A–
|-
| 2000
! scope=row | Unbreakable
| 70% (173 reviews)
| 62 (31 reviews)
| align="center" | C
|-
| 2002
! scope=row | Signs
| 74% (236 reviews)
| 59 (36 reviews)
| align="center" | B
|-
| 2004
! scope=row | 
| 43% (218 reviews)
| 44 (40 reviews)
| align="center" | C
|-
| 2006
! scope=row | Lady in the Water
| 25% (212 reviews)
| 36 (36 reviews)
| align="center" | B–
|-
| 2008
! scope=row | 
| 17% (185 reviews)
| 34 (38 reviews)
| align="center" | D
|-
| 2010
! scope=row | 
| 5% (192 reviews)
| 20 (33 reviews)
| align="center" | C
|-
| 2013
! scope=row | After Earth
| 12% (213 reviews)
| 33 (41 reviews)
| align="center" | B
|-
| 2015
! scope=row | 
| 68% (229 reviews)
| 55 (34 reviews)
| align="center" | B–
|-
| 2016
! scope=row | Split
| 77% (307 reviews)
| 62 (47 reviews)
| align="center" | B+
|-
| 2019
! scope=row | Glass
| 36% (396 reviews)
| 43 (53 reviews)
| align="center" | B
|-
| 2021
! scope=row| Old
| 50% (313 reviews)
| 55 (52 reviews)
| align="center" | C+
|-
| 2023
! scope=row| Knock at the Cabin
| 68% (235 reviews) 
| 63 (54 reviews)
| align="center" | C
|}

See also
 List of awards and nominations received by M. Night Shyamalan

Notes

References

External links
 

Shyamalan, M. Night